This is a historical list, intended to deal with the time period where it is believed that women working in science were rare. For this reason, this list ends with the 20th century.

Antiquity

 Gargi Vachaknavi (7th century BCE), Indian philosopher
 Abrotelia (5th century BCE), philosopher in Ancient Greece
 Aemilia (c. 300 CE–363 CE), Gallo-Roman physician
 Aesara of Lucania (4th or 3rd century BCE), philosopher in Ancient Greece
 Agamede (12th century BCE), physician in Ancient Greece (possibly mythical) 
 Aglaonike (2nd century BCE), first woman astronomer in Ancient Greece
 Agnodike (4th century BCE), first woman physician to practice legally in Athens
 Andromache (mid-6th century), Egyptian physician
 Anyte (300 BCE), Greek physician and poet
 Arete of Cyrene (5th–4th centuries BCE), Greek natural and moral philosopher
 Artemisia of Caria (c. 300 BCE), botanist
 Asclepigenia (4th CE), Greek Neoplatonist
 Aspasia (4th century BCE), philosopher and scientist
 Aspasia the Physician (fl. 1st century CE), Greek physician
 Axiothea of Phlius (fl. c. 350 BCE), Greek philosopher
 Aurelia Alexandria Zosime, Ancient Roman physician
 Beronice (1st century CE), Roman philosopher
 Caerellia (c. 45 BCE), Roman academician
 Chun Yuyan (1st century BCE), Chinese obstetrician and gynecologist
 Clea (1st–2nd century CE), philosopher
 Cleachma (5th century BCE), Greek philosopher
 Cleopatra the Alchemist (c. 3rd century CE), wrote the alchemical book, Chrysopoeia, or "gold-making" 
 Damo (6th century BCE), Greek natural philosopher 
 Diotima of Mantinea (4th century BCE), philosopher and scientist, ancient Greece 
 Eccello of Lucania (5th or 4th century BCE), Greek/Italian mathematician and natural philosopher
 Echecratia the Philiasian (5th century BCE), Greek/Italian mathematician and natural philosopher
 Elephantis (1st century BCE), Greek physician
 Enheduanna (c. 2285–2250 BCE), Sumerian/Akkadian astronomer and poet
 Fabiola (died 399 CE), Roman physician
 Fang (first century BCE), Chinese chemist
 Favilla (2nd century), Roman physician
 Gu Bao (4th century), Chinese physician
 Hypatia (370–415 CE), mathematician and astronomer, Egypt
 Laïs (c. 1st/2nd century BCE), midwife
 Lais of Corinth, Ancient Greek physician
 Lastheneia of Mantinea (5th century BCE), student of Plato
 Leontium (3rd BCE), Greek philosopher
 Leoparda (4th century CE), gynecologist
 Macrina (4th century CE), Greek physician and nun
 Marcella (4th century CE), Roman healer
 Mary the Jewess (1st or 2nd century CE), alchemist
 Melissa (3rd century BCE), Greek philosopher
 Metrodora (c. 200–400 CE), Greek physician and author
 Minucia Asste, Ancient Roman physician 
 Myia (5th century BCE), Greek philosopher
 Nicerata (c. 5th century), physician and healer
 
 Occello of Lucania (4th or 5th century BCE), Greek natural philosopher and mathematician
 Olympias of Thebes (1st century BCE), Greek midwife
 Origenia (2nd century CE), Greek healer
 Pao Ku Ko (3rd century CE), Chinese chemist
 Paphnutia the Virgin (c. 300), Egyptian alchemist
 Paula (347–404 CE), Roman healer
 Perictione (5th century BCE), Greek philosopher, mother of Plato
 Panthea, Ancient Greek physician, wife and colleague of Glycon
 Philinna of Thessaly, Ancient Greek physician

 Peseshet, Egyptian physician (Fourth Dynasty)
 Pulcheria (5th century CE), healer
 Pythias of Assos (4th century BCE), marine zoologist
 Restituta (1st century), Ancient Roman physician  
 Salpe of Lesbos, Ancient Greek physician 
 Salpe (1st century BCE), Greek midwife
 Sotira (1st century BCE), Greek physician

 Tapputi-Belatekallim (First mentioned in a clay tablet dating to 2000 BCE), Babylonian perfumer, the first person in history recorded as using a chemical process
 Terentia Prima, Ancient Roman physician 
 Theano (6th century BCE), philosopher, mathematician and physician
 Thelka, Iranian
 Theosebeia (4th century CE), healer

 Yi Jia (2nd century BCE), Chinese physician

Middle Ages

 Abella (14th century), Italian physician
 Adelle of the Saracens (12th century), Italian physician
 Adelmota of Carrara (14th century), Italian physician
 Rufaida Al-Aslamia (7th century), Muslim nurse
 Maesta Antonia (1386–1408), Florentine physician
 Ameline la Miresse (fl. 1313–1325), French physician
 Jeanne d'Ausshure (d. 1366), French surgeon
 Zulema L'Astròloga (1190-after 1229), Moorish astronomer
 Brunetta de Siena (fl. 15th century), Italian-Jewish physician
 Hildegard of Bingen (1099–1179), German natural philosopher
 Sibyl of Benevento, Napolitan physician specializing in the plague buboes
 Gentile Budrioli (?-1498), Italian astrologer and herbalist
 Constanza, Italian surgeon, mentioned in Pope Sixtus IV edict regarding physicians and surgeons. 
 Denice (fl. 1292), French barber-surgeon
 Demud (fl. ca. 13th century), German physician
 Dobrodeia of Kiev  (fl. 1122), Byzantine physician
 Dorotea Bucca (fl. 1390), Italian professor of medicine
 Constance Calenda (15th century), Italian surgeon specializing in diseases of the eye
 Virdimura of Catania (fl. 1376), Jewish-Sicilian physician
 Caterina of Florence (fl. 1400s), Florentine physician
 Jeanne de Cusey (fl. 1438), French barber-surgeon
 Antonia Daniello (fl. 1400), Florentine-Jewish physician 
 Clarice di Durisio (15th century), Italian physician
 Fava of Manosque (fl. 1322), French-Jewish physician
 Jacobina Félicie (fl. 1322), Italian physician
 Francesca, muller de Berenguer Satorra (15th century), Catalan physician 
 Maria Gallicia (fl. 1309), licensed surgeon
 Bellayne Gallipapa (fl. 1380), Zaragoza, Spanish-Jewish physician
 Dolcich Gallipapa (fl. 1384), Leyda, Spanish-Jewish physician
 Na Pla Gallipapa (fl. 1387), Zaragoza, Spanish-Jewish physician
 Sarah de St Giles (fl. 1326), French-Jewish physician and medical teacher
 Alessandra Giliani (fl. 1318), Italian anatomist
 Rebecca de Guarna (fl. 1200), Italian physician
 Magistra Hersend (fl. 1249–1259), French surgeon
 Maria Incarnata, Italian surgeon, mentioned in Pope Sixtus IV edict regarding physicians and surgeons.
 Isabiau la Mergesse (fl. 1292), French-Jewish physician
 Floreta La-Noga (fl. 1374), Aragonese physician
 Helvidis (fl. 1176), French physician
 Keng Hsien-Seng (10th century), Chinese chemist 
 Li Shao Yun (11th century), Chinese chemist 
 Stephanie de Lyon (fl. 1265), French physician
 Guillemette du Luys  (fl. 1479), French royal surgeon 
 Thomasia de Mattio, Italian physician, mentioned in Pope Sixtus IV edict regarding physicians and surgeons.
 Margherita di Napoli (late 14th century), Napolitan oculist active in Frankfurt-am-Main
 Mercuriade (14th century), Italian physician and surgeon
 Gilette de Narbonne (fl. 1300), French physician
 Isabella da Ocre, Napolitan surgeon
 Francisca da Romana, Napolitan physician
 Dame Péronelle (1292–1319), French herbalist
 Peretta Peronne, also called Perretta Petone (fl. 1411), French surgeon
 Lauretta Ponte da Saracena Calabria, Napolitan physician
 Trota of Salerno (fl. 1090), Italian physician
 Marguerite Saluzzi (fl. 1460), Napolitan licensed herbalist physician
 Sara de Sancto Aegidio (fl. 1326), French physician
 Juana Sarrovia (fl. 1384), Barcelona, Spanish physician
 Shen Yu Hsiu (15th century), Chinese chemist 
 Sun Pu-Eh (12th century), Chinese chemist 
 Raymunda da Taberna, licensed Napolitan surgeon
 Théophanie (fl. 1291), French barber surgeon
 Trotta da Toya (f. 1307), Napolitan physician
 Polisena da Troya (fl. 1335), licensed Napolitan surgeon
 Margarita da Venosa (fl. 1333), licensed Napolitan surgeon, who studied at the University of Salerno She was considered a noteworthy practitioner and counted Ladislaus, king of Naples, as a patient.
 Francisca di Vestis (fl. 1308), Napolian physician
 Zhang Xiaoniang (11th century), Chinese physician

16th century

 Maria Andreae (1550–1632), German pharmacist
 Marie de Brimeu (1550–1605), Flemish botanist
 Sophia Brahe (1556–1643), Danish astronomer and chemist
 Isabella Cortese (fl. 1561), Italian alchemist
 Helena Magenbuch (1523–1597), German pharmacist
 Loredana Marcello (died 1572), Venetian botanist
 Elizabeth Moulthorne (fl. 1593), English barber-surgeon
 Tarquinia Molza (1542–1617), Italian natural philosopher
 Catherine de Parthenay (1554–1631), French mathematician
 Elinor Sneshell (fl. 1593), English surgeon
 Agatha Streicher (1520–1581), German physician
 Caterina Vitale (1566–1619), Maltese pharmacist and chemist
 Tan Yunxian (1461–1554), Chinese physician

17th century

 Anna Åkerhjelm (1647–1693), Swedish traveler and archaeologist
 Ann Baynard (1672–1697), British Natural philosopher
 Aphra Behn (1640–1689), British translator of an astronomical work
 Martine Bertereau (1600–fl.1642), French mineralogist
 Agnes Block (1629–1704), Dutch horticulturalist
 Elisabeth of Bohemia, Princess Palatine (1618–1680), German natural philosopher
 Louise Bourgeois Boursier (1563–1636), French obstetrician
 Titia Brongersma (1650–1700), Frisian archaeologist, poet 
 Margaret Cavendish (1623–1673), natural philosopher
 
 Marie Crous (fl. 1640), French mathematician
 Maria Cunitz (1610–1664), Silesian astronomer
 Jeanne Dumée (1660–1706), French astronomer

 Maria Clara Eimmart (1676–1707), German astronomer
 Marie Fouquet (1590–1681), French medical writer
 Eleanor Glanville (1654–1709), English entomologist
 Elisabeth Hevelius (1647–1693), Polish astronomer

 Maria Sibylla Merian (1647–1717), naturalist
 Marie Meurdrac (c. 1610–1680), French chemist and alchemist
 Elena Cornaro Piscopia (1646–1684), Italian mathematician and the first female PhD
 Marguerite de la Sablière (c. 1640–1693), French natural philosopher
 Jane Sharp (fl. 1671), British obstetrician
 Justine Siegemund (1636–1705), German obstetrician 
 Mary Somerset, Duchess of Beaufort (1630–1715), English botanist
 Elizabeth Walker (1623–1690), British pharmacist

18th century

 Maria Gaetana Agnesi (1718–1799), Italian mathematician
 Geneviève Charlotte d'Arconville (1720–1805), French anatomist 
 Madeleine-Françoise Calais (circa 1713 - fl. 1740) French dentist.
 Princess Charlotte of Saxe-Meiningen (1751–1827), German astronomer
 Maria Angela Ardinghelli (1728–1825), Italian mathematician and physicist
 Sarah Sophia Banks (1744–1818), British natural history collector
 Giuseppa Barbapiccola (c. 1702–1740), natural philosopher, translator
 Jeanne Baret (1740–1807), French circumnavigator and botanist
 Laura Bassi (1711–1778), Italian physicist
 Marie Marguerite Bihéron (1719–1795), French anatomist 
 Celia Grillo Borromeo (1684–1777), Italian natural philosopher
 Jacoba van den Brande (1735–1794), Dutch founder of first all-female science academy
 Maria Christina Bruhn (1732–1808), Swedish inventor
 Margaret Bryan (c. 1760–1815), British natural philosopher
 Elsa Beata Bunge (1734–1819), Swedish botanist
 Lydia Byam (fl. 1797–1800), naturalist
 María Andrea Casamayor (1700–1780), Spanish mathematician 
 Émilie du Châtelet (1706–1749), French mathematician and physicist
 Maria Medina Coeli (1764–1846), Italian physician
 Jane Colden (1724–1766), American biologist
 Rosalie de Constant (1758–1834), Swiss naturalist
 Angélique du Coudray (1712–1794), French midwife
 Maria Dalle Donne (1778–1842), Italian physician
 Catharina Helena Dörrien (1717 – 1795), German botanist 
 Eva Ekeblad (1724–1786), Swedish agronomist
 Dorothea Erxleben (1715–1762), German physician
 Charlotta Frölich (1698–1770), Swedish agronomist and historian
 Elizabeth Fulhame (fl. 1794), British chemist
 Lucia Galeazzi Galvani (1743–1788), Italian physician
 Sophie Germain (1776–1831), elasticity theory, number theory
 Clelia Durazzo Grimaldi (1760–1830), Italian botanist
 Catherine Littlefield Greene (1755–1814), American inventor
 Salomée Halpir (1718-fl. 1763), Lithuanian oculist 
 Caroline Herschel (1750–1848), German-British astronomer
 Catherine Jérémie (1664–1744), French-Canadian botanist
 Christine Kirch (1696–1782), German astronomer
 Margaretha Kirch (1703–1744), German astronomer
 Maria Margarethe Kirch (1670–1720), German astronomer
 Marie Lachapelle (1769–1821), French midwife
 Marie-Jeanne de Lalande (1760–1832), French astronomer
 Marie Paulze Lavoisier (1758–1836), French chemist and illustrator
 Nicole-Reine Lepaute (1723–1792), French astronomer
 Elisabeth Christina von Linné (1743–1782), Swedish botanist
 Martha Daniell Logan (1704–1779), American horticulturalist
 Eliza Lucas (1722–1793), American agronomist and indigo dye pioneer
 Maria Lullin (1750–1831), Swiss entomologist
 Catharine Macaulay (1731–1791), British social scientist
 Anna Morandi Manzolini (1716–1774), Italian physician and anatomist
 Marie Le Masson Le Golft (1750–1826), French naturalist 
 Sybilla Masters (1675–1720), patent for a corn mill
 Lady Anne Monson (1726–1776), English botanist
 Maria Petraccini (1759–1791), Italian anatomist and physician
 Zaffira Peretti (fl. 1780), Italian anatomist and physician
 Claudine Picardet (1735–1820) French chemist, mineralogist and meteorologist
 Louise du Pierry (1746–1807), French astronomer
 Marie Anne Victoire Pigeon (1724–1767), French mathematician
 Faustina Pignatelli (1705–1785), Italian physicist
 Anna Barbara Reinhart (1730–1796), Swiss mathematician
 Cristina Roccati (1732–1797), Italian physics teacher
 Jane Squire (bap. 1686 – 1743), English mathematician
 Clotilde Tambroni (1758–1817), Italian philologist and linguistic
 Petronella Johanna de Timmerman (1723–1786), Dutch scientist
 Wang Zhenyi (1768–1797), Chinese astronomer

19th century

Anthropology
 Maria Czaplicka (1884–1921), Polish cultural anthropologist
 Alice Cunningham Fletcher (1838–1923), American ethnologist
 Johanna Mestorf (1828–1909), German prehistoric archaeologist
 Margaret Murray (1863–1963), British anthropologist
 Clémence Royer (1830–1902), French anthropologist
 Ellen Churchill Semple (1863–1932), American geographer
 Praskovja Uvarova (1840–1924), Russian archaeologist

Archeology
 Cornelia Horsford (1861– c. 1941), American archaeologist
 Lady Hester Stanhope (1776–1839), British archaeologist
 Zsófia Torma (1832–1899), Hungarian archaeologist, paleologist, anthropologist

Astronomy

 Mary Albertson (1838–1914), American botanist and astronomer
 Annie Jump Cannon (1863–1941), American astronomer
 Agnes Mary Clerke (1842–1907), British astronomer
 Florence Cushman (1860–1940), American astronomer
 Cecilia Payne-Gaposchkin (1900–1979), American astronomer and astrophysicist 
 Williamina Fleming (1857–1911), Scottish/American astronomer
 Caroline Herschel  (1750–1848), German astronomer active in England
 Margaret Lindsay Murray Huggins (1848–1915), British astronomer
 Henrietta Swan Leavitt (1868–1921), American astronomer
 Annie Russell Maunder (1868–1947), Irish astronomer
 Antonia Caetana Maury (1866–1952), American astronomer
 Maria Mitchell (1818–1889), American astronomer
 Isis Pogson (1852–1945), British astronomer
 Caterina Scarpellini (1808–1873), Italian astronomer
 Sarah Frances Whiting (1846–1927), American astronomer and physicist
 Mary Watson Whitney (1847–1921), American astronomer
 Anna Winlock (1857–1904), American astronomer

Biology or natural history

 Frances Acton (1793–1881), British botanist
 Elizabeth Cary Agassiz (1822–1907), American natural historian
 Mary Albertson (1838–1914), American botanist and astronomer
 Mary Anning (1799–1847), British natural historian
 Emily Arnesen (1876–1928), Norwegian zoologist
 Anna Atkins (1799–1871), British botanist
 Harriet Henrietta Beaufort (1778–1865), British botanist
 Isabella Bird Bishop (1831–1904), British natural historian
 Priscilla Susan Bury (1799–1872), English botanist
 Albertina Carlsson (1848–1930), Swedish zoologist
 Mary Agnes Meara Chase (1869–1963), American biologist
 Cornelia Clapp (1849–1934), American zoologist
 Anna Botsford Comstock (1854–1930), American natural historian
 Clara Eaton Cummings (1855–1906), American botanist
 Eunice P. Cutter (1819-1898), American author of anatomy textbooks
 Lydia Maria Adams DeWitt (1859–1928), American pathologist
 Mary Cynthia Dickerson (1866–1923), American herpetologist, museum curator and writer
 Amalie Dietrich (1821–1891), German natural historian
 Alice Eastwood (1859–1953), American biologist
 Rosa Smith Eigenmann (1858–1947), American biologist
 Olga Fedtschenko (1845–1921), Russian botanist
 Maria Elizabeth Fernald (1839–1919), American entomologist 
 Elisabetta Fiorini Mazzanti (1799–1879), Italian botanist
 Susanna Phelps Gage (1857–1915), American embryologist and comparative anatomist
 Lilian Jane Gould (1861–1936), British biologist 
 Amelia Griffiths (1768–1858), British phycologist
 Marian E. Hubbard (1868–1956), American zoologist
 Agnes Ibbetson (1757–1823), English vegetable physiologist
 Susan Hallowell (1835–1911), American botanist
 Gabrielle Howard (1876–1930), British plant physiologist
 Ellen Hutchins (1785–1815), Irish botanist
 Ida Henrietta Hyde (1857–1945), American biologist
 Maria Elizabetha Jacson (1755–1829), English botanist
 Alice Johnson (1860–1940), English zoologist
 Józefa Joteyko (1866–1928), physiologist, psychologist, pedagogist
 Josephine Kablick (1787–1863), botanist
 Helen Dean King (1869–1955), American biologist
 Phoebe Lankester (1825–1900), British botanist
 Marie-Anne Libert (1782–1865), Belgian botanist and mycologist
 Friederike Lienig (1790–1855), German-Baltic entomologist
 Elizabeth Eaton Morse (1864–1955), American mycologist/cryptogamist 
 Katharine Murray Lyell (1817–1915), British botanist
 Helen Abbott Michael (1857–1904), American botanist and chemist
 Olive Thorne Miller (1831–1918), American natural historian
 Maria Gugelberg von Moos (1836–1918), Swiss botanist
 Margaretta Morris (1797–1867), American entomologist
 Mary Murtfeldt (1848–1913), American biologist
 Eleanor Anne Ormerod (1828–1901), British biologist
 Edith Marion Patch (1876–1954), American biologist
 Beatrix Potter (1866–1943), British mycologist
 Mary Jane Rathbun (1860–1943), American marine biologist
 Margaretta Riley (1804–1899), British botanic 
 Caroline Rosenberg (1810–1902), Danish botanist
 Ethel Sargant (1863–1918), British biologist
 Hazel Schmoll (1890–1990), American botanist working on plant life in Colorado
 Lilian Sheldon (1862–1942), English zoologist
 Alexandra Smirnoff (1838–1913), Finnish pomologist
 Annie Lorrain Smith (1854–1937), British lichenologist and mycologist
 Emilie Snethlage (1868–1929), German-Brazilian naturalist and ornithologist
 Nettie Stevens (1861–1912), American geneticist
 Jantina Tammes (1871–1947), Dutch botanist and geneticist 
 Charlotte De Bernier Taylor (1806–1863), American entomologist 
 Mary Treat (1830–1923), American naturalist
 Anna Vickers (1852–1906), marine algologist
 Jeanne Villepreux-Power (1794–1871), French marine biologist
 Anna Maria Walker (c. 1778–1852), Scottish botanist
 Elizabeth Andrew Warren (1786–1864), Cornish botanist
 Mary Anne Whitby (1784–1850), English breeder of silkworms

Chemistry

 Vera Bogdanovskaia (1868–1897), Russian chemist
 Ida Freund (1863–1914), first woman to be a university chemistry lecturer in the United Kingdom
 Louise Hammarström (1849–1917), Swedish chemist
 Edith Humphrey (1875–1978), probably the first British woman to gain a doctorate in chemistry 
 Julia Lermontova (1846–1919), Russian chemist
 Laura Linton (1853–1915), American chemist 
 Rachel Lloyd (1839–1900), American chemist 
 Adelaida Lukanina (1843–1908), Russian physician and chemist
 Helen Abbott Michael (1857–1904), American botanist and chemist
 Frances Micklethwait (1867–1950), British research chemist
 Muriel Wheldale Onslow (1880–1932), British biochemist
 Marie Pasteur (1826–1910), French chemist and bacteriologist
 Mary Engle Pennington (1872–1952), American chemist
 Agnes Pockels (1862–1935), German chemist
 Vera Popova (1867–1896), Russian chemist
 Anna Sundström (1785–1871), Swedish chemist
 Ellen Swallow Richards (1842–1911), American industrial and environmental chemist
 Margarete Traube (1856–1912), German-born chemist who lived in Italy
 Anna Volkova (1800–1876), Russian chemist
 Martha Annie Whiteley (1866–1956), English chemist and mathematician
 Nadezhda Olimpievna Ziber-Shumova (died 1914), Russian chemist

Engineers
 Emily Roebling (1844–1903), American civil engineer
 Lanying Lin (1918–2003), Chinese materials science

Geology
 Florence Bascom (1862–1945), American geologist
 Etheldred Benett (1776–1845), British geologist
 Mary Buckland (1797–1857), British paleontologist and marine biologist
 Margaret Crosfield (1859–1952), British paleontologist and geologist
 Maria Gordon (1896–1939), Scottish geologist
 Mary Emilie Holmes (1850–1906), American geologist and educator
 Charlotte Murchison (1788–1869), Scottish geologist
 Elizabeth Philpot (1780–1857), British paleontologist

Inventors 
 Tabitha Babbitt (1779–1853), American inventor and tool maker
 Mary Brush (fl. 1815), American inventor
 Martha Coston (1826–1904), American inventor
 Ellen Eglin (1849–fl. 1890), American inventor
 Caroline Eichler (1809–1843), German inventor, instrument maker and prostheses designer.
 Hanna Hammarström (1829–1909), Swedish inventor
 Mary Kies (1752–1837), American inventor
 Margaret E. Knight (1838–1914), American inventor, first woman awarded a U.S. patent
 Huang Lü (died 1829), Chinese optic inventor

Mathematics

 Sofia Kovalevskaya (1850–1891), Russian mathematician (partial differential equations, rotating solids, Abelian functions)
 Augusta Ada Byron Lovelace (1815–1851), British mathematician
 Emilie Martin (1869–1936), American mathematician
 Florence Nightingale  (1820–1910), British statistician and nurse
 Emmy Noether (1882–1935), German mathematician

Microbiology
 Alice Catherine Evans (1881–1975), American microbiologist

Medicine 

 Rachel Alcock (1862–1939), British physiologist
 Elizabeth Garrett Anderson (1836–1917), British physician 
 Hedda Andersson (1861–1950), Swedish physician
 Lovisa Årberg (1801–1881), first woman doctor and surgeon in Sweden
 Amalia Assur (1803–1889), Swedish dentist
 Sara Josephine Baker (1873–1945), American doctor (child hygiene pioneer)
 Chandramukhi Basu (1860–1944), Indian physician
 Elizabeth Blackwell (1821–1910), American physician 
 Emily Blackwell (1826–1910), American physician
 Marie Boivin (1773–1841), French writer on obstetrics
 Elizabeth D. A. Cohen (1820–1921), American physician, first female physician in the state of Louisiana
 Rebecca Cole (1846–1922) American physician, by 1867 she was the second African-American woman to become a doctor in the United States
 Rebecca Lee Crumpler (1831–1895) American physician, by 1864 she was the first African-American woman to become a doctor in the United States
 Maria Dalle Donne (1778–1842), Italian physician
 Marie Durocher (1809–1893), Brazilian obstetrician, midwife and physician
 Enriqueta Favez (c. 1791–1856), Swiss physician and surgeon
 Rosalie Fougelberg (1841–1911), Swedish dentist
 Rupa Bai Furdoonji, Indian physician who was the world's first female anesthetist
 Kadambini Ganguly (1861–1923), Indian physician
 Johanna Hedén (1837–1912), Swedish midwife, feldsher and barber
 Aletta Jacobs (1854–1929), Dutch physician
 Maria Jansson (1788–1842), known as Kisamor, Swedish physician
 Sophia Jex-Blake (1840–1912), British physician
 Anandi Gopal Joshi (1865–1887), Indian physician
 Mary Poonen Lukose (1886–1976), Indian gynecologist
 Emmy Rappe (1835–1896), Swedish nurse
 Martha Ripley (1843–1912), American physician and suffragist
 Varvara Kashevarova Rudneva (1844–1899), Russian physician
 Florence R. Sabin (1871–1953), American medical scientist
 Ellen Sandelin (1862–1907), Swedish physician and teacher of physiology
 Regina von Siebold (1771–1849), German physician and obstetrician
 Charlotte von Siebold (1788–1859), German physician and gynecologist
 Anna Stecksén (1870–1904), Swedish pathologist
 Lucy Hobbs Taylor (1833–1910), American dentist
 Isala Van Diest (1842–1916), first female medical doctor and female university graduate in Belgium
 Catharine van Tussenbroek (1852–1925), Dutch gynecologist
 Mary Walker (1832–1919), American surgeon
 Karolina Widerström (1856–1949), Swedish physician
 Marie Elisabeth Zakrzewska (1829-1902), Polish-American physician

Nuclear physics
 Lise Meitner (1878–1968), Austrian, Swedish, nuclear physicist

Physics
 Hertha Marks Ayrton (1854–1923), British physicist
 Mileva Einstein-Maric (1875–1948), Serbian/Swiss physicist
 Margaret Eliza Maltby (1860–1944), American physicist
 Mary Somerville (1780–1872), British physicist, polymath
 Eunice Newton Foote (1819–1888), American inventor and physicist who first discovered rising carbon dioxide (CO2) levels could impact climate

Psychology
 Mary Whiton Calkins (1863–1930), American psychologist
 Christine Ladd-Franklin (1847–1930), American psychologist
 Margaret Floy Washburn (1871–1939), American psychologist
 Anna Freud (1895–1982), Austrian-British psychoanalyst

Science education
 Jane Webb Loudon (1807–1858), Writer of introductory gardening books
 Jane Marcet (1769–1858), Writer of introductory science books
 Almira Hart Lincoln Phelps (1793–1884), American science educator
 Josephine Silone Yates (died 1912), American chemistry professor

Sociology
 Jane Addams (1860–1935), American sociologist
 Charlotte Perkins Gilman (1860–1935), American sociologist
 Beatrice Webb (1858–1943), English sociologist and economist

See also
 Timeline of women in science

Notes

References

External links
 4000 Years of Women in Science
 Most influential British women in the history of science  (selected by Royal Society panel)

16th on
.
.
.
.
Ancient women scientists
Medieval women scientists